Anne Morgan may refer to:

Anne Morgan (author) (born 1954), Australian writer
Anne Morgan (philanthropist) (1873–1952), American relief worker 
Anne Morgan, Baroness Hunsdon (1529–1607), English noblewoman
Anne Morgan (make-up artist), Academy Award winner

See also
Ann Morgan (disambiguation)
Anna Morgan (disambiguation)